Juris Bērziņš (born 8 March 1954 in Riga, Latvia) is a Latvian former rower who competed for the Soviet Union in the 1980 Summer Olympics.

In 1980 he was the coxswain of the Soviet boat that won the silver medal in the coxed fours event.

References

External links
 

1954 births
Latvian male rowers
Soviet male rowers
Coxswains (rowing)
Rowers at the 1980 Summer Olympics
Olympic rowers of the Soviet Union
Medalists at the 1980 Summer Olympics
Olympic medalists in rowing
Olympic silver medalists for the Soviet Union
Sportspeople from Riga
Living people
World Rowing Championships medalists for the Soviet Union